NGC 5821 is a spiral galaxy with a ring structure in the constellation Boötes. It lies near a similarly massed galaxy, NGC 5820, at the same redshift. Both galaxies were discovered by the astronomer William Herschel.

References

External links
 
Distance 
Image NGC 5821
SIMBAD data

NGC 5821
5821
09648
53532
53532
+09-25-002
Spiral galaxies